Muratovo is a rural locality (a village) in Dmitriyevogorskoye Rural Settlement, Melenkovsky District, Vladimir Oblast, Russia. The population was 14 as of 2010.

Geography 
Muratovo is located 28 km southeast of Melenki (the district's administrative centre) by road. Okshovo is the nearest rural locality.

References 

Rural localities in Melenkovsky District